Blue Blood is a 1973 British horror drama film directed by Andrew Sinclair. It was based on the 1972 novel The Carry-Cot by Alexander Thynn, 7th Marquess of Bath, and stars Oliver Reed, Fiona Lewis, Derek Jacobi and Thynn's wife Anna Gaël.

Plot
Gregory, the young lord of the Swanbrook estate, engages German nanny Beate to care for his children while he pursues a life of debauchery with his mistress Carlotta and their affluent friends. His wife Lily, a touring singer, makes occasional visits. Gregory entrusts all running of the Swanbrook manor house to his menacing butler, Tom, who scorns his weak-willed master's decadent ways and plots to take control. From her interactions with the other servants, Beate comes to realise that Tom is, in many ways, already the true master of Swanbrook.

Tom uses dark magic against Beate, Carlotta and Lily, giving them visions of a Satanic ritual involving the sacrifice of Gregory and Lily's son, Edgar. When Edgar and his sister are found with unexplained injuries, Beate is accused of child abuse and given notice. 

Tom passes the visions on to Gregory, whose mind is broken when he pictures Tom sacrificing Edgar. In the closing scenes, Tom, having fully usurped Gregory, changes into his master's attire and greets the returning Lily (who does not question the change) as his lady.

Cast

 Oliver Reed as Tom 
 Fiona Lewis as Lily 
 Derek Jacobi as Gregory 
 Anna Gaël as Carlotta 
 Meg Wynn Owen as Beate 
 John Rainer as Clurman 
 Richard Davies as Jones 
 Gwyneth Owen as Agnes 
 Patrick Carter as Cocky 
 Elaine Ives-Cameron as Serena 
 Tim Wylton as Morrell 
 Hubert Rees as Dr Barratt 
 Dilys Price as Mrs Barratt 
 Andrew McCall as Gerrard 
 Sally Anne Newton as Susannah
 Timon Sinclair as Edgar

Production
Jacquemine Charrott Lodwidge was the film's art director.

Filming
Blue Blood was made on location at Longleat House, the seat of the Marquesses of Bath. According to Sinclair, it was filmed in three weeks.

Release

Critical response
In a contemporary review, Richard Combs of The Monthly Film Bulletin described Blue Blood as a series of "cheap, coarsely-filmed charades" and criticised the film's direction: "once Sinclair gets down to working out his theme (black-blooded butler usurps degenerate, blue-blooded employer), the skimpiness of his material and the shoddiness of this TV-sketch technique become painfully evident." He also wrote that Reed's performance made Tom "one of the most physically repellent of screen villains".

Describing the film as "a variation on Harold Pinter's The Servant", Graeme Clark of website The Spinning Image writes that Blue Blood over-emphasises a simple premise and frustratingly leaves plot threads unresolved. He notes that although the Satanic images build suspense, they do not pay off as they are merely symbolic. He also argues that the film is sustained solely by the performances of the cast, adding however that none of them are "really working at full strength here".

References

Bibliography
 Rigby, Jonathan. English Gothic: A Century of Horror Cinema. Reynolds & Hearn, 2000.

External links

1973 films
1973 horror films
1973 independent films
1970s British films
1970s English-language films
1970s supernatural horror films
British independent films
British supernatural horror films
Films about adultery in the United Kingdom
Films about dysfunctional families
Films about nannies
Films about nobility
Films about Satanism
Films based on British novels
Films directed by Andrew Sinclair
Films set in country houses
Films set in England
Films shot in Wiltshire